Queen Judith may refer to:

Judith of Babenberg (c. late 1110s/1120 – after 1168), daughter of Leopold III, Margrave of Austria and Agnes of Germany, married William V, Marquess of Montferrat
Judith, Duchess of Bavaria (925 – June 29 soon after 985), daughter of Arnulf, Duke of Bavaria and Judith, married Henry I, Duke of Bavaria
Judith of Bavaria (died 843) (805 - April 19 or 23, 843), daughter of Count of Welf and Hedwig, Duchess of Bavaria, became second wife of Louis the Pious
Judith Premyslid (c. 1057–1086), daughter of Vratislaus II of Bohemia and Adelaide of Hungary, became second wife of Władysław I Herman
Judith of Brittany (982 – 1017), daughter of Conan I of Rennes and Ermengarde of Anjou, Duchess of Brittany, married Richard II, Duke of Normandy
Judith of Flanders (October 844 – 870), daughter of Charles the Bald and Ermentrude of Orléans, married Æthelwulf of Wessex
Judith of Habsburg (1271 – May 21, 1297), daughter of Rudolph I of Germany and Gertrude of Hohenburg, married to Wenceslaus II of Bohemia
Judith of Hungary (d.988), daughter of Géza of Hungary and Sarolt, married Bolesław I Chrobry
Gudit, legendary queen of the Kingdom of Semien, sometimes referred to as Judith 
Judith of Schweinfurt (before 1003 – 2 August 1058), daughter of Henry, Margrave of Nordgau and Gertrude, married Bretislaus I, Duke of Bohemia
Judith of Swabia (1047/1054–1093/1095), daughter of Henry III, Holy Roman Emperor and Agnes of Poitou, married Władysław I Herman, successor to Judith of Bohemia
Judith of Thuringia (c. 1135 - d. 9 September after 1174), daughter of Louis I, Landgrave of Thuringia and Hedwig of Gudensberg, married Vladislaus II of Bohemia

See also 
Judith (name)